Pomacea megastoma is a species of gastropod belonging to the family Ampullariidae.

The species is found in South America. The species inhabits freshwater environments.

References

megastoma
Gastropods described in 1825